Burgess John Reeve, also often mentioned as B. J. Reeve was an architect based in Los Angeles whose 1882 Phillips Block was when built the largest and most monumental building in what was then a town of around 12,000 people.

Selected works
All in Los Angeles, California.
Forthmann Carriage House, Angelino Heights, Los Angeles (Los Angeles Historic-Cultural Monument)
Forthmann House c. 1887,  North University Park Historic District of West Adams, Los Angeles (Los Angeles Historic-Cultural Monument)
Phillips Block, Spring St. west side south of Temple St., c. 1882, home of A. Hamburger & Sons "The People's Store", the largest retailer in Los Angeles at the time; predecessor of May Company California, four stories, second four-story building in Los Angeles, cost $260,000
Hotel Ramona/Ramona Block, SW corner of Third and Spring, Los Angeles (1885, demolished Demolished in 1903 and replaced by the Washington Building, built 1912, Parkinson and Bergstrom, still standing.
Sentous Block or Sentous Building (19th c., demolished late 1950s) was located at 615-9 N Main St., with a back entrance on 616-620 North Spring St. (previously called Upper Main St., then San Fernando St.). Designed in 1886. Louis Sentous was a French pioneer in the early days of Los Angeles. The San Fernando Theatre was located here. The site is now part of the El Pueblo parking lot.
St. Vincent's College and Church, predecessor of Loyola Marymount University, campus at northeast corner of Washington and Grand (razed), cost $65,000
United States Hotel, three stories, cost $56,000

Gallery: Phillips Block

Gallery: Other works

References

19th-century American architects
Architects from Los Angeles
American people of British descent
Year of birth missing
Year of death missing